Bagari County is an administrative area in Wau State, South Sudan.

References

Counties of South Sudan